Acrocephalomyia is a genus of flies in the family Ropalomeridae. It contains three recognized species.

Species 
 Acrocephalomyia pulchra Alvim & Ale-Rocha, 2016
 Acrocephalomyia torulosa Alvim & Ale-Rocha, 2016
 Acrocephalomyia zumbadoi Ibáñez-Bernal & Hernández-Ortiz, 2012

References 

Sciomyzoidea genera